Adam Norman Carroll (born 26 October 1982) is a Northern Irish professional racing driver. He last raced in the 2016–17 Formula E season for Jaguar Racing. He has also raced for Team Ireland in A1 Grand Prix, winning the series in 2009.

Career history

Early career
Carroll, who was born in Portadown, Northern Ireland, started his career in 1993 competing in karting events. He continued in karting until 1998. After winning the Elf LA FILIERE SCHOLARSHIP in 1999 he moved on to British Formula Ford, winning the Winter Series and taking 3rd in the festival. He raced in the British Formula Ford competition in 2001, before successfully making the move to British Formula 3 B-Class in 2002 with the Sweeney team. Despite driving year-old cars, Carroll was always an outright front runner and he dominated the class winning the title with a record points tally.

International racing
In 2003, Carroll moved up to Championship Class British Formula 3, but due to lack of finance, he had little stability and finished the year having driven with three different teams (8 podiums in a row with Menu), before competing in part of the Formula Three Euroseries season, where despite being new to both team, series, track and tyres, he finished in the points in his first race. He also partnered and outperformed future Formula One driver Nico Rosberg in an end of season event in South Korea. He continued in Formula Three throughout 2004, finishing as runner up to Nelson Piquet Jr. before joining the 2005 GP2 Series, replacing Hayanari Shimoda at the Super Nova Racing team just before the start of the season.

Although Carroll's pre-season preparation for GP2 left him at a disadvantage to all the other drivers due to the lateness of his race deal and consequent lack of testing with his new team, he was immediately competitive, briefly challenging for the championship before slipping back as the season progressed due to reliability setbacks and on-track incidents.

Despite continually having trouble raising a budget for his racing, he has still managed to outperform drivers who have had funding readily available to them, including 2005 team-mate, and ex F1 driver, Giorgio Pantano. His undoubted talent caught the eye of Formula One and in 2005 he was signed as a test driver for Formula One team BAR-Honda. For the 2006 GP2 season he surprised many in choosing to join the Racing Engineering team when his previous team had a better chance of picking up the title. It soon became clear that due to Carroll's continued lack of sponsorship, the Racing Engineering deal saved him from having to drop out of top line motorsport altogether. He has since removed himself from the Honda driver program sensing a lack of opportunity as Button and Barrichello would be hard to replace.

The only real high point of the 2006 season was a pole position, third place and second place combo at Silverstone. It was clear throughout the season, however, that Carroll's team was not as strong as the majority of the other teams in the series. This was highlighted many times due to car failures that cost him many points throughout the year. As well as this, the car was distinctly slower and he also had trouble with other drivers hitting him from behind. This coupled with a driver error while leading race two in Hungary cost Carroll a lot of points that, should he have gained them, he would have been in contention for at least third in the championship. As it was though, Carroll's 33 points was enough to give him eighth place (equal points with seventh-placed Gianmaria Bruni with Bruni ahead having scored more wins). Carroll scored all of his team's points, outscoring his old team Super Nova Racing.

DTM, GP2 and A1GP

For the start of the 2007 season, Carroll was driving a two-year-old Audi A4 in the German DTM series for the Futurecom TME team. On 26 June it was announced that he would replace Antônio Pizzonia in the FMS GP2 team for the event supporting the French Grand Prix. Carroll won at the Silverstone round of the GP2 series and scored 4 other points to take a total of 13 in one weekend, only his second back in GP2, in a car that had only scored one point beforehand. It was announced on 13 July that he had left the DTM due to sponsorship problems, and concentrated on GP2 for the rest of 2007. Carroll also went on to claim victory in the first race at the Hungaroring, despite starting sixth and changing all four tires during his mandatory pit stop. The season did not end so well for Carroll, as he scored only 2 points in the last three races despite being in contention for much more. However, he did finish in seventh place, ahead of many drivers who, unlike Carroll, had completed the entire season. During this time, Adam had tested the A1GP car for Ireland, impressing everyone at Silverstone and so for the second event onwards, Adam signed up to race in A1GP. His first weekend demonstrated yet again what a talent he was as he got Ireland's biggest points haul in the history of A1GP by netting a podium in his first race and despite starting 18th on the grid due to being blocked in qualifying, 6th in the feature race. Later in the season, he won the Mexico City feature race, Ireland's first win in A1GP. He also finished on the podium at Brands Hatch, en route to helping Team Ireland finish 6th overall in the championship.

Carroll began the 2008 GP2 Series season without a drive, but when Adrián Vallés was dropped by FMS International after the first round of the season, he took part in four races for his old team. He was then replaced by Marko Asmer.

For 2008/2009, Carroll returned to A1GP and Team Ireland again leading them to victory for the first time, in China. A1 Team Ireland became the fourth A1 Grand Prix champions, after a title battle which went down to the final round in Great Britain. Ireland won with 112 points, all scored by Carroll and included five race victories and three fastest laps.

Carroll announced in April 2009 that he was approached by two F1 teams in negotiation for a driver's seat for 2010. It turned out that the two teams were Campos Meta and Manor GP, both of which were new entries for the 2010 season. Carroll said that he could not raise the 4 million Euros needed to sign for Virgin. He was also in line for a drive with Lola, which was also planning to enter the sport in 2010, but the British marque's entry was turned down.

IndyCar
IndyCar Series team Andretti Autosport announced that Carroll was to take part in some races during the second half of the 2010 season. He ultimately competed in the Watkins Glen Grand Prix and the Honda Indy 200, finishing in 16th and 19th places respectively. He scored 26 points in total and finished the season 34th in the drivers' championship.

2011

On 2 July, Carroll made a one-off appearance in the Formula Renault 3.5 Series at the sixth round of the championship where he finished fourth and third in the two races. This was in place of the injured Austrian driver, Walter Grubmüller. He also drove in the Donington round of the Auto GP series taking pole and finishing 5th and 2nd in the races. He then returned to GP2 with Super Nova Racing for the German round replacing Luca Filippi.

Formula E
Carroll frequented the series during the 2015–16 season as a potential substitute driver for Mahindra and Team Aguri, neither of which came to fruition. On 19 August 2016, Carroll was listed as one of four drivers partaking with Jaguar Racing in the 2016–17 Formula E pre-season test at Donington Park, having tested with the team previously. Carroll was subsequently signed with the team.

In the 2020–21 Formula E season, Carroll was signed as NIO 333's reserve driver.

Sports car racing
In 2023, Carroll joined Team WRT in the GT World Challenge Europe Endurance Cup, driving alongside Lewis Proctor and Tim Whale in the team's #31 entry. He also added a part-time campaign in the GT World Challenge America with Esses Racing.

Racing record

Complete Formula 3 Euro Series results
(key)

Complete GP2 Series results
(key) (Races in bold indicate pole position) (Races in italics indicate fastest lap)

Complete Deutsche Tourenwagen Masters results
(key) (Races in bold indicate pole position) (Races in italics indicate fastest lap)

† Driver did not finish, but was classified as he completed 90% of the winner's race distance.

Complete A1 Grand Prix results
(key) (Races in bold indicate pole position) (Races in italics indicate fastest lap)

American open–wheel results
(key)

IndyCar

Complete Auto GP results
(key) (Races in bold indicate pole position) (Races in italics indicate fastest lap)

Complete European Le Mans Series results

Complete British GT Championship results
(key) (Races in bold indicate pole position) (Races in italics indicate fastest lap)

Complete FIA World Endurance Championship results

24 Hours of Le Mans results

Complete Formula E results

Ferrari Challenge Finali Mondiali results

References

External links
Official website

1982 births
Living people
People from Portadown
Racing drivers from Northern Ireland
Formula Palmer Audi drivers
Formula Ford drivers
British Formula Three Championship drivers
Formula 3 Euro Series drivers
GP2 Series drivers
Deutsche Tourenwagen Masters drivers
A1 Team Ireland drivers
IndyCar Series drivers
People educated at Killicomaine Junior High School
World Series Formula V8 3.5 drivers
Auto GP drivers
Blancpain Endurance Series drivers
European Le Mans Series drivers
24 Hours of Le Mans drivers
24 Hours of Spa drivers
British GT Championship drivers
Formula E drivers
International GT Open drivers
Jaguar Racing drivers
Racing Engineering drivers
Super Nova Racing drivers
Kolles Racing drivers
Andretti Autosport drivers
Campos Racing drivers
Techeetah drivers
Status Grand Prix drivers
A1 Grand Prix drivers
Audi Sport drivers
Alan Docking Racing drivers
P1 Motorsport drivers
AFS Racing drivers
Scuderia Coloni drivers
W Racing Team drivers
GT4 European Series drivers
Ferrari Challenge drivers